Breitenberg is a municipality in the district of Passau in Bavaria in Germany. It lies on the border with Austria, and is the easternmost municipality of Bavaria.

References

Passau (district)